Jean-Jacques Hublin (born 30 November 1953) is a French paleoanthropologist. He is a professor at the Max Planck Society, Leiden University and the University of Leipzig and the founder and director of the Department of Human Evolution at the Max Planck Institute for Evolutionary Anthropology in Leipzig, Germany. He is best known for his work on the Pleistocene hominins, and on the Neandertals and early Homo sapiens, in particular.

Hublin is the president of the European Society for the study of Human Evolution. In 2019, the organization came under fire after Hublin was accused of both sexual and professional misconduct with younger researchers.

Personal life and education
Hublin lived in Algeria until his family fled the country in the last year of the independence war in 1961. He spent his teenage years living in the subsidized housing of the northern Parisian suburbs. He later trained as a geologist and paleontologist at the Pierre and Marie Curie University of Paris, where he received his doctorate in 1978 under the supervision of Prof. B. Vandermeersch. He received his state doctorate (habilitation) in anthropology in 1991 at the University of Bordeaux. Hublin currently lives in Leipzig, Germany with his wife Svetlana.

Career
After being hired as a researcher with the French National Center for Scientific Research (CNRS) in 1981 and working in different departments at the University of Paris, the National Natural History Museum in Paris, and the CNRS, Hublin became director of research at the CNRS. He was a visiting professor at the University of California - Berkeley in 1992, a visiting scholar at Harvard University in 1997, and a visiting professor at Stanford University in 1999 and 2011. In 2000, he was hired as a professor of anthropology at the University of Bordeaux I. In 2004, he became professor at the Max Planck Society (Germany) and moved to Leipzig to found the Department of Human Evolution at the newly created Max Planck Institute for Evolutionary Anthropology. In 2005, he was made honorary professor at the University of Leipzig. Hublin has had several administrative positions at various points in his career, and in particular, was Deputy Director in charge of the Prehistoric Archaeology, Biological Anthropology, and Paleoenvironmental Sciences sector of the French CNRS in 2002-2003. Currently, Hublin is one of the Directors of the MPI-EVA in Leipzig. In 2010, Hublin founded the European Society for the study of Human Evolution (ESHE) and has been its president since 2011. Hublin was appointed invited professor and international chair of paleoanthropology at the Collège de France in Paris in 2014, and holds an annual lecture series aimed at making paleoanthropology accessible to a general audience.

Controversy
In 2019, a largely-anonymous group of early-career researchers pledged to boycott the annual meeting of the European Society for the study of Human Evolution, a group led by Hublin, in the wake of allegations that he had pursued an extra-marital affair with a graduate student, "made sexual advances on other women at scientific conferences", dismissed a postdoctoral researcher out of jealousy over the researcher's partner, and bullied other researchers "around issues of intellectual property and co-authorship". In response, Hublin denied the allegations, calling them "a toxic mix of half-truths, professional rivalry, and conspiracy theory propagated by people who have no clue".

Scientific work
Hublin has dedicated most of his career to the study of Middle and Late Pleistocene hominins, and in particular, to the biological and cultural evolution of Neandertals and to the origin of modern humans. He has also conducted fieldwork in various sites in Europe and North Africa. He also is the president of the European Society for the study of Human Evolution.

The origin of the Neandertals
Hublin’s research initially focused on the origin of Neandertals, and in early 1980s, he used cladistic methods to demonstrate that this extinct lineage of humans was rooted much earlier than was thought at the time. He demonstrated that none of the European fossil material predating 40,000 years ago could be related to modern human ancestry. His views on Neandertal evolution were later fully confirmed by various discoveries, in particular, by the spectacular discovery of the fossil series from Sima de los Huesos (Atapuerca, Spain). He is best known for having proposed the ‘accretion model’ for the emergence of the Neandertals, a model that emphasizes the role of the environment, demographic fluctuations, and genetic drift in recent human evolution. This model has found much support in subsequent paleogenetical works.

North Africa and the origin of Homo sapiens
Another major focus of his research is on the origin of modern humans in Africa, specifically North Africa, where he has been conducting fieldwork for several years. In particular, at the site of Jebel Irhoud (Morocco), he has discovered important new fossil hominins, which document the emergence of our species more than 300,000 years ago and reveal that early Homo sapiens were not only represented in sub-Saharan Africa.

The fate of Neandertals
Hublin's demonstration that modern behaviors were present in the very last Neandertals was a major contribution to the field. His work on Late Neandertal sites, such as those of Saint-Césaire and Arcy-sur-Cure (France)(list of Neandertal sites), provided evidence for the late survival of Neandertals in Europe after the arrival of modern humans and the beginning of a genuinely “Upper Paleolithic” culture on the continent. He was one of the first to promote the “acculturation hypothesis”, which seeks to explain the cultural evolution of the latest western Neandertals through the distant influence of the first modern populations already present in central Europe.

Virtual paleoanthropology
In 1992, Hublin published the first application of virtual manipulation for the reconstruction of a human fossil from multiple pieces. Since then, he has further developed these techniques which provide new insights into the understanding of the anatomical evolution, cognitive development, and life history of our ancestors and their extinct relatives. His group provided new evidence on diverse issues such as the timing of brain development in early representatives of the genus Homo, the birth process of Neandertals, and the dental development of early Homo sapiens and Neandertals.

Selected publications

Books

Articles and Chapters in Edited Volumes

References

External links
Jean-Jacques Hublin at the Max Planck Institute for Evolutionary Anthropology

Video 
 Video on Jean-Jacques Hublin's research (Latest Thinking)

1953 births
Living people
French paleoanthropologists
French National Centre for Scientific Research scientists
People from Mostaganem
Max Planck Institute for Evolutionary Anthropology
Pierre and Marie Curie University alumni
Academic staff of the University of Bordeaux
Academic staff of Leipzig University
Academic staff of Leiden University
Max Planck Institute directors
Research directors of the French National Centre for Scientific Research